Mangchi is a Korean word  (Mangchi) that means hammer. It may refer to:

A character in Hammerboy, a Korean animated film
Maangchi, a Korean-American YouTuber and cookbook author